Defending champion Esther Vergeer defeated Yana Buchina in the final, 6–1, 6–2 to win the women's singles wheelchair tennis title at the 2006 US Open.

Draw

Finals

References 
 Draw

Women's Wheelchair Singles
U.S. Open, 2006 Women's Singles